Thomas Taylour, 1st Earl of Bective, KP, PC (Ire) (20 October 1724 – 14 February 1795) was an Irish peer and politician.

Early life
He was the oldest son of the former Sarah Graham and Sir Thomas Taylor, 2nd Baronet, a Member of the Parliament of England (MP) for Maidstone from 1689 to 1696. His sister, Henrietta Taylor, was the wife of Richard Moore.

His paternal grandparents were the former Anne Cotton (a daughter of Sir Robert Cotton, 1st Baronet, of Combermere) and Sir Thomas Taylor, 1st Baronet (a son of Thomas Taylor, who settled in Ireland from Sussex following the Cromwellian conquest of Ireland in 1652). His maternal grandfather was John Graham. In 1757, Bective succeeded his father as baronet.

He was educated at Trinity College, Dublin.

Career
Bective entered the Irish House of Commons in 1747 and sat as Member of Parliament (MP) for Kells until 1760, when he was elevated to the Peerage of Ireland as Baron Headfort, of Headfort, in the County of Meath. He was further honoured in 1762, he was made Viscount Headfort, of Headfort, in the County of Meath in 1762, and on 24 October 1766, he was advanced to the dignity of Earl of Bective, of Bective Castle, in the County of Meath.

In 1783, Bective became a founding member of the Most Illustrious Order of St Patrick and in 1785 he was sworn of the Privy Council of Ireland.

Personal life
On 4 July 1754, he married Hon. Jane Rowley, daughter of Rt. Hon. Hercules Langford Rowley and his wife Elizabeth Rowley, 1st Viscountess Langford. Her brother, Hercules Rowley, 2nd Viscount Langford, represented County Antrim and Downpatrick in the Irish Parliament. Together, they had four daughters and six sons, including:

 Thomas Taylour, 1st Marquess of Headfort (1757–1829), who married Mary Quin, a granddaughter of Sir Henry Cavendish, 1st Baronet.
 Major Hon. Hercules Taylour (1759–1790), who represented Kells like his father and died unmarried.
 General Hon. Robert Taylour (1760–1839), who also represented Kells and died unmarried.
 Clotworthy Rowley, 1st Baron Langford (1763–1825), who assumed the surname of Rowley, by Royal licence, in 1796, when he inherited the Rowley estates and was ennobled in his own right as Baron Langford of Summerhill in 1800. He married his first cousin, Frances Rowley, daughter of Hon. Major Clotworthy Rowley.
 Rev. Hon. Henry Edward Taylour (1768–1852), who married Marianne St Leger, daughter of Col. Hon. Richard St Leger and granddaughter of the 1st Viscount Doneraile.
 Lady Henrietta Taylour (d. 1838), who married Chambré Brabazon Ponsonby-Barker, son of Chambré Brabazon Ponsonby, in 1791.
 Lady Catherine Taylour, who died unmarried.

Lord Bective died, aged 70, on 14 February 1795 and was succeeded in his titles by his oldest son Thomas. The widowed Countess of Bective died on 25 June 1818.

Descendants
Through his daughter Lady Henrietta, he was a grandfather of four, including Catherine Jane Ponsonby-Barker (who married Edward Michael Conolly MP).

Through his son, the Rev. Henry, he was a grandfather of Thomas Edward Taylor, MP and Chancellor of the Duchy of Lancaster, and General Sir Richard Chambré Hayes Taylor (1819–1904), who enjoyed a long and distinguished career in the army.

References

|-

1724 births
1795 deaths
Thomas
Earls of Bective
Alumni of Trinity College Dublin
Peers of Ireland created by George II
Irish MPs 1727–1760
Knights of St Patrick
Members of the Parliament of Ireland (pre-1801) for County Meath constituencies
Members of the Privy Council of Ireland